Heligmosomoides is a genus of nematodes belonging to the family Heligosomidae.

The species of this genus are found in Europe and Northern America.

Species:

Heligmosomoides aberrans 
Heligmosomoides americanus 
Heligmosomoides asakawae 
Heligmosomoides azerbaidjani 
Heligmosomoides bakeri 
Heligmosomoides borealis 
Heligmosomoides corsicus 
Heligmosomoides desportesi 
Heligmosomoides dubius 
Heligmosomoides glareoli 
Heligmosomoides glomerophilus 
Heligmosomoides hudsoni 
Heligmosomoides juvenus 
Heligmosomoides kratochvili 
Heligmosomoides kurilensis 
Heligmosomoides laevis 
Heligmosomoides longicirratum 
Heligmosomoides longispiculum 
Heligmosomoides neopolygyrus 
Heligmosomoides orientalis 
Heligmosomoides polygyrus 
Heligmosomoides protobullosus 
Heligmosomoides ryjikovi
Heligmosomoides skrjabini 
Heligmosomoides smirnovae 
Heligmosomoides speciosus
Heligmosomoides thomomyos 
Heligmosomoides travassosi 
Heligmosomoides turgidus 
Heligmosomoides ussuriensis 
Heligmosomoides wisconsinensis 
Heligmosomoides yorkei

References

Nematodes